Let's Drip Awhile is the second live album by Australian blues and rock band Jo Jo Zep & The Falcons and released early in 1979. The album peaked at number 85 on the Australian Kent Music Report in July 1979. It was the band's final release on Oz Records.

The album is an expansion of the band's EP (and first live album release), Live!! Loud and Clear, released in February 1978.

Track listing

Charts

References 

1979 live albums
Live albums by Australian artists
Jo Jo Zep & The Falcons albums
Albums produced by Joe Camilleri